Lorenzo Netteb (born 30 October 1980 in Amsterdam) is a Dutch footballer who played for Eerste Divisie club FC Eindhoven during the 2007-2009 football seasons.

Personal life
Born in the Netherlands, Netteb is of Surinamese descent.

References

Dutch footballers
Footballers from Amsterdam
Dutch sportspeople of Surinamese descent
FC Eindhoven players
Eerste Divisie players
1982 births
Living people
Association footballers not categorized by position